The Rakaposhi-Haramosh Mountains are a subrange of the Karakoram range. They are located in the Bagrot Valley Gilgit and Nagar Districts, in the Gilgit-Baltistan of Pakistan.

Geography 
Rakaposhi-Haramosh Mountains are bordered by Barpu and the Chogo Lungma Glaciers in the north, by the Shigar River in the east, by the Gilgit and Indus Rivers in the south, and by the Hunza River in the west.

The two namesake peaks, Rakaposhi (7,788 m/25,551 ft) and Haramosh (7,409 m/24,308 ft), are among the largest in the world in terms of rise above local terrain, due to their positions near very low valleys. Rakaposhi rises dramatically above a bend in the Hunza River, forming the western anchor of the range, while Haramosh stands on the north side of the Indus River, in the south-central portion of the range.

Selected peaks

See also
 List of highest mountains

References

Mountain ranges of Gilgit-Baltistan
Mountain ranges of the Karakoram